"Look Dad No Tunes" is a 1999 CD single by Birkenhead indie band Half Man Half Biscuit, released by Probe Plus Records, for whom they have always recorded.

John Peel (19392004; BBC Radio 1 DJ 19672004), who greatly admired the band, included "Look Dad No Tunes" at No. 11 in his 1999 Festive Fifty.

Track listing 
"Look Dad No Tunes"
"Ecclesiastical Perks"
"Lock Up Your Mountain Bikes"

Notes 
 "Look Dad No Tunes" is also included on the 2000 album Trouble over Bridgwater.
 "Lock Up Your Mountain Bikes" parodies the traditional song "She'll Be Coming 'Round the Mountain".

References

External links 
  The oldest-established Half Man Half Biscuit fansite.
  The Half Man Half Biscuit Lyrics Project.

1999 songs
Half Man Half Biscuit songs